John Wilson Kyle,  (10 February 1926 – 27 November 2014), commonly referred to as Jack Kyle or Jackie Kyle, was a rugby union player who played for Ireland, the British and Irish Lions and the Barbarians during the 1940s and 1950s. Kyle is best known for leading Ireland to a grand slam in the 1948 Five Nations Championship. In 1950, Kyle was declared one of the six players of the year by the New Zealand Rugby Almanac. Kyle is a member of the International Rugby Hall of Fame, and was inducted into the IRB Hall of Fame before the two halls merged to form the current World Rugby Hall of Fame. He was named the  Greatest Ever Irish Rugby Player  by the Irish Rugby Football Union in 2002.

Kyle was educated at Belfast Royal Academy and studied medicine at Queen's University, Belfast. He graduated in 1951 and in 1991, he was awarded an honorary doctorate by the university. In 2007, he was awarded a Lifetime Achievement Award by the Irish Journal of Medical Science and the Royal Academy of Medicine in Ireland. He was awarded an OBE in 1959.

Rugby international

Ireland
Kyle first played for Ireland during the Second World War in a friendly against a British Army XV. However, no caps were awarded. 
He made his official debut for Ireland on 25 January 1947 against France in the 1947 Five Nations Championship in an 8–12 defeat Lansdowne Road.	
	
Between 1947 and 1958, while playing for Ireland, he went on to make 46 full appearances and score 24 points, including 7 tries.	

The highlight of his Ireland career came during the 1948 Five Nations Championship when, together with Karl Mullen and Mick O'Flanagan, he helped Ireland win a grand slam. Kyle played in all four games and he is often credited with masterminding Ireland's success. In 1949, he also helped Ireland win the Triple Crown and in 1951, they won the title again. Kyle made his last appearance for Ireland against Scotland on 1 March 1958. Following a solo try against France at Ravenhill in 1953, an impressed newspaper journalist parodied The Scarlet Pimpernel with the lines:
They seek him here, they seek him there
Those Frenchies seek him everywhere.
That paragon of pace and guile,
That damned elusive Jackie Kyle.

British and Irish Lions
In 1950, Kyle also played for the British Lions on their tour to New Zealand and Australia. He played in 20 of the 29 games, including all six Tests. Among his tour highlights was a display that came in the first Test, a 9–9 draw with New Zealand. Of the Lions' nine points, Kyle scored a try, created another for Ken Jones and won a penalty that was converted by John Robins. During the tour, he also scored a try in the 24–3 defeat of Australia.

Barbarians
Kyle made eight appearances for the Barbarian F.C.'s between 1948 and 1954, scoring three points in total.

Later years
After retiring from club rugby in 1963, Kyle embarked on humanitarian work in Sumatra and Indonesia. Between 1966 and 2000, he worked as a consultant surgeon in Chingola, Zambia. He then returned to Northern Ireland and settled in County Down. He remained involved in rugby and in 2001, established the Jack Kyle Bursary Fund in support of the Queen's University RFC Rugby Academy.

Kyle died on 28 November 2014 after a prolonged illness and is survived by his son Caleb and daughter Justine.

Honours
Ireland

Five Nations Championship
Winner (3): 1948, 1949, 1951

References

1926 births
2014 deaths
World Rugby Hall of Fame inductees
Irish rugby union players
Ireland international rugby union players
Queen's University RFC players
North of Ireland F.C. players
Ulster Rugby players
British & Irish Lions rugby union players from Ireland
Barbarian F.C. players
Rugby union fly-halves
People educated at the Belfast Royal Academy
Alumni of Queen's University Belfast
Surgeons from Northern Ireland
Officers of the Order of the British Empire
Rugby union players from Belfast